BarberShop (Music From the Motion Picture) is the soundtrack to Tim Story's 2002 comedy film Barbershop. It was released on August 27, 2002 through Epic Records and consists of hip hop and R&B music. The album peaked at #29 on the Billboard 200, at #9 on the Top R&B/Hip-Hop Albums and at #1 on the Top Soundtracks. Its lead single. "Stingy" by Ginuwine, made it to #33 on the Billboard Hot 100 and #7 on the Hot R&B/Hip-Hop Singles & Tracks.

Track listing

Charts

References

External links

2002 soundtrack albums
2000s film soundtrack albums
Hip hop soundtracks
Epic Records soundtracks
Albums produced by Al Bell
Albums produced by Eddie F
Albums produced by DJ Clue?
Albums produced by Bryan-Michael Cox
Albums produced by Bink (record producer)
Albums produced by Troy Taylor (record producer)
Albums produced by the Underdogs (production team)
Barbershop (franchise)
Comedy film soundtracks